Matthew Lewis (born 6 June 1990 in Sydney) is an Australian footballer who plays for Blacktown City.

Biography
On 25 January 2009 Lewis made his debut for the Central Coast Mariners against Adelaide United at Bluetongue Stadium, Gosford.

On 15 September 2010 Lewis competed in a 100-metre race alongside the likes of Jarryd Hayne, Greg Inglis, Nathan Gardner, Josh Morris, Ben Barba, Lachie Turner and Courtenay Dempsey to find the fastest football player in Australia.

References

External links
 Central Coast Mariners profile
 Lewis at Blacktown City

1990 births
Living people
Australian soccer players
A-League Men players
Blacktown City FC players
Central Coast Mariners FC players
Association football midfielders
National Premier Leagues players